Heris (also Romanized as Herīs; also known as Hīrīz and Rīz) is a village in Sanjabad-e Gharbi Rural District, in the Central District of Kowsar County, Ardabil Province, Iran. At the 2006 census, its population was 277, in 68 families.

References 

Tageo

Towns and villages in Kowsar County